The Men's FIH Hockey Nations Cup is an international men's field hockey tournament organised annually by the International Hockey Federation. The tournament serves as the qualification tournament for the Men's FIH Pro League.

The tournament was founded in 2019 and the first edition will be held in November 2022 in Potchefstroom, South Africa.

Results

Team appearances

See also 

 Men's FIH Pro League
 Women's FIH Hockey Nations Cup
 Women's FIH Pro League

Notes

References

External links
International Hockey Federation

 
Nations Cup
FIH Hockey Nations Cup